Sites for launching large rockets are often equipped with a sound suppression system to absorb or deflect acoustic energy generated during a rocket launch.  As engine exhaust gasses exceed the speed of sound, they collide with the ambient air and shockwaves are created, with noise levels approaching 200 db. This energy can be reflected by the launch platform and pad surfaces, and could potentially cause damage to the launch vehicle, payload, and crew. For instance, the maximum admissible overall sound power level (OASPL) for payload integrity is approximately 145 db. Sound is dissipated by huge volumes of water distributed across the launch pad and launch platform during liftoff. Although the primary reason for the water deluge is to reduce extreme heat damage to the launch structure, it also serves to suppress sound waves that can damage the vehicle upon launch. 

Water-based acoustic suppression systems are common on launch pads.  They aid in reducing acoustic energy by injecting large quantities of water below the launch pad into the exhaust plume and in the area above the pad. Flame deflectors or flame trenches are designed to channel rocket exhaust away from the launch pad but also redirect acoustic energy away.

Soviet Union/Russia 

NASA

Space Shuttle program 

Data from the launch of STS-1 found an overpressure wave created by the shuttle's three SSME (now designated RS-25) liquid-fueled rocket engines and the four-segment solid rocket boosters contributed to the loss of sixteen and damage to an additional 148 thermal protection tiles prompting modifications to the Sound Suppression Water System (SSWS) installed at both launch pads at Kennedy Space Center's Launch Complex 39.

The resulting gravity fed system, used through the remainder of the program, began release from a  water tower at the launch site 6.6 seconds before main engine start through  diameter pipes connected to the mobile launch platform. Water flowed out six  towers known as "rainbirds" onto the launch platform and flame trench below, emptying the system in 41 seconds with a peak flow of  reducing acoustic energy levels to approximately 142 dB.

The massive white clouds that billowed around the shuttle at each launch were not smoke, but wet steam generated as the rocket exhaust boiled away huge quantities of water.

Antares 
Engine exhaust exits through ring of water jets in the launch platform, directly beneath engine nozzles. Additional storage tanks totaling  may be added for static fire tests. Water not vaporized is held in a  retention basin where it is tested before release.

Space Launch System 
Following the retirement of the Space Shuttle program, pad B at launch complex 39 was upgraded for launches of the Space Launch System (SLS).  SLS features an additional RS-25 liquid-fueled rocket engine along with an additional segment in each of its solid rocket boosters over the Space Shuttle program prompting upgrades to the system creating the Ignition Over-Pressure/Sound Suppression Water System (IOP/SS).

Japan Aerospace Exploration Agency (JAXA) 
JAXA "seeks to achieve the world's quietest launch" from their Noshiro Rocket Test Center in Akita with the installation of a sound suppression water system as well as sound absorbing walls. The H3 Scaled Acoustic Reduction Experiment completed in 2017 provided additional data about the noise generated during liftoff.

References 

Acoustics
Rocketry